C18 is an untarred road in the Hardap Region of central Namibia. It starts off at the M39 on the Namibia–Botswana border by the Nossob River. It then ends  later when it joins the B1. The town of Gibeon and the Fish River can then be accessed by driving  down the D1089.

References

Roads in Namibia
Buildings and structures in Hardap Region